Antonio "Toni" Muñoz Gómez (born 4 February 1968), sometimes known as just Toni, is a Spanish former professional footballer who played as a left back.

Best known for his stint at Atlético Madrid – 243 La Liga games in ten seasons – he also worked with the club in various directorial capacities until 2006.

Club career
Born in Córdoba, Andalusia, Toni moved to the capital with Atlético Madrid after a spell with local Córdoba CF, playing for the reserves in his first year. He spent the 1990–91 season as understudy to Juan Carlos, then made the left-back position his own. In 1995–96, he appeared in 40 La Liga games out of 42 as the Colchoneros won the double.

In June 2001, after a total of only 15 appearances in his last two years as a player, Muñoz retired but stayed connected with his main club, first as a youth coordinator then as director of football. He left the latter position at the end of the 2005–06 campaign, as Atlético failed to qualify for European competition. The following year, he moved to neighbouring Getafe CF as football director.

International career
Toni played ten matches with Spain in one year, as the nation had failed to qualify for the UEFA Euro 1992. His debut came on 11 March 1992, in a 2–0 friendly win over the United States in Valladolid.

The following year, on 22 September, Toni scored against Albania in a 5–1 away rout for the 1994 FIFA World Cup qualifiers, in what would be his last cap.

International goals
Scores and results list Spain's goal tally first, score column indicates score after each Toni goal.

Honours
Atlético Madrid
La Liga: 1995–96
Copa del Rey: 1990–91, 1991–92, 1995–96

References

External links

1968 births
Living people
Footballers from Córdoba, Spain
Spanish footballers
Association football defenders
Spain international footballers
La Liga players
Segunda División players
Segunda División B players
Córdoba CF players
Atlético Madrid B players
Atlético Madrid footballers